Jomo Kenyatta (c. 1897 – 1978) was the first Prime Minister and President of Kenya.

Kenyatta may also refer to:
 Kenyatta (given name), an American masculine given name
 Kenyatta (surname)
 Kenyatta University, a public university in Kenya
 Lake Kenyatta, a lake in northeastern Kenya
 Kenyatta series, a series of novels by Donald Goines under the pseudonym of Al C. Clark
 Kenyatta, a 1973 documentary film and part of The Black Man's Land Trilogy

See also
 Kenyatta family